Streatham was a constituency used for elections to the London County Council between 1919 and the council's abolition, in 1965.  The seat shared boundaries with the UK Parliament constituency of the same name.

Councillors

Election results

References

London County Council constituencies
Politics of the London Borough of Lambeth
Streatham